Ian Roy Chapman (born 21 December 1939) is an Australian former cyclist. He competed in the 1000m time trial at the 1960 Summer Olympics.

References

External links
 
 

1939 births
Living people
Australian male cyclists
Olympic cyclists of Australia
Cyclists at the 1960 Summer Olympics
Sportspeople from Bendigo
Commonwealth Games medallists in cycling
Commonwealth Games silver medallists for Australia
Cyclists at the 1962 British Empire and Commonwealth Games
20th-century Australian people
21st-century Australian people
Medallists at the 1962 British Empire and Commonwealth Games